Danilo Fischetti (born 26 January 1998) is an Italian professional rugby union player who primarily plays prop for London Irish of the English Premiership.

Professional career 
Under contract with Calvisano, in 2018–19 Pro14 season, he named as Permit Player for Zebre in Pro 14. From 2019 to 2022, Fischetti played with Zebre.

In 2017 and 2018, Fischetti was named in the Italy Under 20 squad.  From 2019 he was also named in the Italy squad, having made his test debut against Wales during the 2020 Six Nations Championship.

References

External links 

1998 births
Living people
Italian rugby union players
Italy international rugby union players
Rugby union props
Rugby Calvisano players
Zebre Parma players
People from Genzano di Roma